The blue-throated toucanet (Aulacorhynchus caeruleogularis) is a near-passerine bird in the toucan family Ramphastidae. It is found in Costa Rica, Panama and far northwestern Colombia.

Taxonomy and systematics

What is now the blue-throated toucanet was two of many subspecies of the then emerald toucanet (Aulacorhynchus prasinus sensu lato). In 2008 the International Ornithological Committee (IOC) split 10 of those subspecies to create seven new species, one of which is the blue-throated toucanet, and retained four of them as subspecies of their current emerald toucanet sensu stricto. BirdLife International's Handbook of the Birds of the World (HBW) concurred. In 2016 the IOC merged the violet-throated toucanet (A. cognatus) into the blue-throated and again HBW concurred. However, the North and South American Classification Committees of the American Ornithological Society and the Clements taxonomy declined to follow them. In 2017 they did split the emerald toucanet into two species, the northern (A. prasinus) and southern (A. albivitta) emerald-toucanets, each with seven subspecies. They treat the IOC's "blue-throated" as two subspecies of the northern emerald-toucanet.

Two subspecies of blue-throated toucanet are recognized by the IOC and HBW:

 The nominate "blue-throated" A. c. caeruleogularis - Gould, 1853
 "Violet-throated toucanet" (A. c. cognatus) - Nelson, 1912: Other names used include Nelson's toucanet and Goldman's blue-throated toucanet.

Description

As in all toucans, the blue-throated toucanet has a large bill. The sexes are alike in appearance although the female generally is smaller and shorter-billed. Their bill is black with a wide yellow stripe along its culmen and a white vertical strip at its base. The nominate subspecies has a rufous patch near the base of the culmen; A. c. cognatus does not. Both subspecies have plumage that is mainly green like that of other members of genus Aulacorhynchus, and is somewhat lighter below than above. The nominate's crown has a bronze tinge and its nape and upper back a yellowy bronze tint; A. c. cognatus crown and nape are almost pure green. Their eye is dark brown surrounded by even darker bare skin. Their lower face and throat are deep blue. Their undertail coverts and the underside of the tail are chestnut. The base of their tail's upper surface is green becoming blue towards the end and the tips of the feathers are chestnut. Immatures are grayer than adults and the chestnut of the tail tips is browner and smaller.

Distribution and habitat

The nominate subspecies of blue-throated toucanet is found along most of the length of Costa Rica into western Panama as far as Veraguas Province. A. c. cognatus is found in central and eastern Panama and slightly into Colombia's Chocó Department. It primarily inhabits humid montane forest but is also found in more open landscapes like secondary forest, shrublands, pastures, and plantations.

A potential problem relates to the distribution limit between A. c. cognatus and A. c. caeruleogularis in Panama. Some authors place the population in central Panama in A. c. caeruleogularis, which limits A. c. cognatus to extreme eastern Panama and adjacent Colombia. However, others assert that the toucanets in central Panama are closer to A. c. cognatus.

Behavior

Movement

The blue-throated toucanet is non-migratory.

Social behavior

The blue-throated toucanet is gregarious and frequently gathers in groups of up to about 10.

Feeding

The blue-throated toucanet forages by gleaning, usually while perched. Its diet is eclectic and includes a wide variety of fruits, invertebrates of many orders, and vertebrate prey such as birds, eggs, lizards, and snakes.

Breeding

The blue-throated toucanet's breeding season is from March to August. It nests in tree cavities, either natural or those abandoned by woodpeckers. The typical clutch size is three or four but can range from one to five. Both sexes incubate the eggs but the female does so more than the male. The incubation period is 16 days and fledging occurs 42 to 45 days after hatch.

Vocal and non-vocal sounds

The blue-throated toucanet's main vocalization is "a loud, far-carrying, dry rrip rrrip rrip rrip or curré curré curré...often continued for minutes on end". In flight its wings make a whirring sound.

Status

The IUCN has assessed the blue-throated toucanet as being of Least Concern. Though its population size is not known, it is believed to be stable. No immediate threats have been identified. However, it "is vulnerable to habitat destruction".

References

Further reading

</ref>

External links
The Blue-throated Toucanet's call on Naturesongs.com
Photos of the Blue-throated Toucanet. Mangoverde

blue-throated toucanet
Birds of the Talamancan montane forests
blue-throated toucanet